The Sulige gas field is a natural gas field located in Inner Mongolia. It was discovered in 2000 and developed by and China National Petroleum Corporation. It began production in 2006 and produces natural gas and condensates. The total proven reserves of the Sulige gas field are around 59.6 trillion cubic feet (1680 km³), and production is slated to be around 1.3 billion cubic feet/day (37×105m³).

References

Natural gas fields in China